Hand Jive is a studio album by the jazz guitarist John Scofield, released in 1994. It features veteran tenor saxophonist Eddie Harris, keyboardist Larry Goldings, bassist Dennis Irwin, percussionist Don Alias, and drummer Bill Stewart.

Critical reception

Entertainment Weekly wrote: "Scofield veers more towards the New Orleans-y BBQ sauce here, working up a delectable new flavor of jazz-soul, in which rough-housing inventiveness is the order of the day." The Los Angeles Times noted that "Scofield has a flexible unit that can be muscular one moment, blues-soaked the next, and gutsy yet highbrow the next."

Track listing
All compositions written by John Scofield.
"I'll Take Les" – 6:58
"Dark Blue" – 7:37
"Do Like Eddie" – 8:06
"She's So Lucky" – 5:50
"Checkered Past" – 5:28
"7th Floor" – 4:45
"Golden Daze" – 7:33
"Don't Shoot the Messenger" – 6:10
"Whip the Mule" – 5:37
"Out of the City" – 5:18

Personnel
John Scofield - guitar
Eddie Harris - tenor saxophone
Larry Goldings - piano, organ
Dennis Irwin - bass
Bill Stewart - drums
Don Alias - percussion

References 

1994 albums
John Scofield albums
Blue Note Records albums